The Rutland Herald is the second largest daily newspaper in the U.S. state of Vermont (after The Burlington Free Press). It is published in Rutland. With a daily circulation of about 12,000, it is the main source of news geared towards the southern part of the state, along with the Brattleboro Reformer and the Bennington Banner. The Rutland Herald is the sister paper of the Barre Montpelier Times Argus. Its seven eras of ownership, much simplified, are sketched below

History
I
The Williams-Williams partnership, which launched the Herald as a weekly on December 8, 1794, was brief but among the most interesting. The Rev. Samuel Williams (1743-1800) was a Federalist with high journalistic standards, but his newspaper, as was true of most during these times, barely touched upon local news or state issues. Judge Samuel Williams (1756-1800) was a distant cousin and political leader of early Vermont.  Both Williamses are buried on North Main Street in Rutland in the same cemetery.

II
The era of printer William Fay, 1797–1840, was somewhat unfocused during a time when all transportation and commerce depended upon the horse. The paper was largely devoted to biblical parables, fables, poems and homilies.

III
George Beaman (1844 to 1856) provided welcome invigoration - for journalistic, political and technological reasons. He was a strong abolitionist who wanted to influence his Whig party (which soon became the Republican party) with anti-slavery sentiments. During his time the railroads arrived, ending rural isolation, providing a boom for commerce, industry and population. Due to Beaman's boosterism, the railroad was routed through Rutland and became its defining industry for the century to follow.

IV
During the era of George and Albert Tuttle (father and son, 1856–1882), the Herald moved to daily publication when the Civil War began and provided some distinguished reportage on the war. The paper was weakened during postwar depressions and several competitors sprang up. In 1877 the major competitor, the Globe, and the Herald merged. Seeking new investors, Albert Tuttle netted the important P.W. Clement.

V
Mixing business, politics and publishing was what Percival W. Clement was all about; he owned the Herald from 1882 to 1927. A Rutland native, Clement also owned Rutland Railroad, the Clement National Bank and New York real estate interests and a brokerage house. He blatantly used his newspaper to support his own projects and political aspirations. He had a strong rivalry with the strong Proctor family of the Vermont Marble Co. Clement held several political offices, and ran for governor three times before being elected in 1918 at the age of 73.

VI
The time of William H. Field and his son William (1927-1947) was one of vastly increased professionalism. Also a Rutland native, Field had a successful career as executive with the Chicago Tribune and was co-founder of the nation's largest-circulation newspaper, the New York Daily News, before returning to Rutland on the death of his father-in-law, Clement, in 1927. At the Herald he started an advertising department, modernized business operations and wrote the annual "Lilac Time" editorial. Bill Field engaged a distinguished typographer to re-design the paper, resulting in major national awards; and he moved the Herald into its present Wales Street building.

VII
The principled era of the Mitchell family began well before Robert W. Mitchell became owner-publisher in 1948 (in partnership with Leroy Noble, the business manager Field had brought from Chicago). Mitchell started at the Herald in 1935 as Vermont Press Bureau reporter in Montpelier, became editor in 1941, and was acting publisher during World War II, when Field enlisted. After 1950 Mitchell took a major role in rebuilding the economy of Rutland, which suffered a massive flood in 1947 and was losing most sources of employment - railroads and stoneworking and "smokestack" industries. He launched an era of some 10,000 editorials over 40 years that promoted the economy and helped rebuild regional confidence, and he gave leadership in commercial and industrial diversification. Mitchell's editorials also supported the ski industry and modern highways, and stood for human rights, amicable race relations and First Amendment freedoms of speech, press, assembly and petition.
Mitchell opposed "chain" newspapers, but the Herald in 1964 acquired the Barre-Montpelier Times Argus to keep it in local ownership; and in 1975 his papers launched a joint Sunday edition. In 1986 the Mitchells acquired the Noble interests in both papers, fending off interest from national newspaper chains, based on a Noble-Mitchell handshake agreement. Bob Mitchell died in 1993, and his son R. John Mitchell, publisher since 1978 of the Times Argus, succeeded his father as Herald publisher.

VIII
In 2016, the Mitchell family sold the Herald and Times Argus to Vermont Community Media, owned by businessmen Chip Harris of New Hampshire and Reade Brower of Maine. In 2018, Vermont Community Media sold the Herald and Times Argus to Sample News Group, who owns the Eagle Times.

Notable contributors
In 2001, the Herald won a Pulitzer Prize for the work of journalist David Moats. Given for his series of editorials defending the civil unions decision in Vermont, this was the first Pulitzer given to the state for journalism.

Award-winning cartoonist Jeff Danziger started his career with the Herald in 1975 and still contributes editorial cartoons and a weekly serial titled 'The Teeds: Tales of Agriculture for the Young and Old'.

Susan Youngwood's 2007 article detailing the anti-Wikipedia stance of professors at Middlebury College has become a commonly cited description of the lack of expertise of Wikipedia editors.

Notes

References
 Smith, Claiborne. "David Moats: Defender of Civil Unions, A straight eye for a gay marriage", February 29, 2004, NewsDay.
 ABC Audit Report. Publisher's Statement of March 31, 2008.

External links
Rutland Herald homepage
Historic Newspaper Pages (1836-1847) on Chronicling America

Rutland, Vermont
Newspapers published in Vermont
Publications established in 1794
1794 establishments in Vermont